Francisco "Kiko" Martínez Sánchez (born 7 March 1986) is a Spanish professional boxer. He is a world champion in two weight classes, having held the IBF featherweight title from 2021 to 2022, and the IBF super-bantamweight title from 2013 to 2014. At regional level, he held the European super-bantamweight title three times between 2007 and 2013, and the European featherweight title in 2018.

Amateur career
Martínez fought extensively as an amateur. He fought 40 amateur bouts and never lost, with 38 of those victories being by knockout. Martinez stated that he "could have gone to the Olympics – the Spanish amateur boxing association wanted me to sign a four-year contract but I wanted to turn professional".

Professional career
Martínez turned professional on 11 June 2004, defeating David Casero by knockout in the third round on a card that included Javier Castillejo.

Martínez went on to win all of his first 11 fights with each victory coming via a knockout within four rounds.

European super-bantamweight champion
On 10 March 2006, Martínez faced Frenchman Salem Bouaita for his EBU European Union super bantamweight title at Pabellón de Elche in Spain. This was Martinez's first fight which went past four rounds and the fight went the full scheduled 10 rounds. Martínez was given a unanimous points win and won the title.

Martínez won a further four fights and became the mandatory challenger European super bantamweight title.

Martínez vs. Dunne
The EBU made Martinez the mandatory challenger for Irish fighter, Bernard Dunne's European super bantamweight title.

Martínez and Dunne clashed on 25 August 2007 at the Point Theatre, Dublin, Ireland. This was Martinez's first fight outside of Spain and despite being the challenger he was confident of victory. Martinez stated before the fight that he "might be a little shorter than Bernard but I'm 5 foot 4 inches of a headache for him".

On the night of the fight the Point Depot filled with expectant Irish boxing fans and the fight was beamed live on RTÉ, the Irish national television broadcaster. The fight started with Dunne keeping his guard low and circling Martínez. However, Martínez quickly had Dunne on the canvas with an overhand right. Dunne appeared stunned and unaware of what had happened. Dunne beat the count but was floored twice more before the referee stopped the fight within only 90 seconds of round one.

The Martínez camp stated that they knew there would be a first round victory and that many of them had placed bets worth thousands of pounds with Irish bookmakers at odds of 66/1 that Martínez would win in the first round.

Controversy
Martínez had signed to fight another Irishman, the Las Vegas-based former WBC bantamweight champion, Wayne McCullough at Belfast's Kings Hall on 1 December 2007.

McCullough had not fought for over two years and the Kings Hall venue was sold out for the fight. However, on the day before the fight there was uproar during the weigh-in and the fight was cancelled amid chaotic scenes. However, Martínez failed to make the agreed weight and was 1.75 lb over the agreed weight.

Martínez was given a couple of hours to shed the excess weight, but did not return to weigh in again and the scales were closed by a BBBofC official. A furious McCullough stated "I couldn't believe it. He comes in over the weight and then after being asked to take it off he just sits there and does nothing. I just can't believe what has happened. I was ready to fight and ready to win and he comes in that much over the weight.".

First loss
Kiko Martínez made his first defence of the EBU super bantamweight title against Rendall Munroe; a title he had successfully taken from Bernard Dunne in August 2007. The fight against Munroe took place at the Harvey Hadden Leisure Centre, Nottingham on 7 March 2008.

The fight turned out to be fairly uneventful as Munroe countered Martínez by blocking and counterpunching, without ever troubling the champion. Meanwhile, Martinez failed to land the big shots that had seen him stop Bernard Dunne. The fight went the full 12 rounds, with Munroe winning by a majority points decision.

Martínez vs. Frampton
On February 9, 2013, Martínez faced Carl Frampton in front of Frampton's home fans in the Odyssey Arena in Belfast. Martinez lost by TKO in Round 9 losing the European Super-bantamweight title.
Carl Frampton and Kiko fought again in September 2014 in Northern Ireland.

“Since the 9th of February 2013, when I get up at five in the morning to go training, I remember him. For me, to defeat him is a greater motivation than the chance to unify the belts," said Martinez.

"I will never forget that night and I will prove that it was just a bad day for me. I am world champion now and my legacy will be bigger for facing Carl Frampton.”

IBF super-bantamweight champion

On 17 August 2013 in New Jersey, Martínez beat Jonatan Romero by TKO to win the IBF Super Bantamweight title. After 2 successful defenses, Martinez then had a rematch with Carl Frampton resulting in Martinez losing his IBF belt.

Since then Martinez has had ten wins and 5 losses. Three of these losses were against World Champions Scott Quigg, Leo Santa Cruz and Gary Russell Jr.

Professional boxing record

References

External links

1986 births
Living people
International Boxing Federation champions
Spanish male boxers
European Boxing Union champions
World super-bantamweight boxing champions
World featherweight boxing champions
20th-century Spanish people
21st-century Spanish people